Kireçburnu Spor Women's Football' is a women's football team based in Kireçburnu, Sarıyer, Istanbul playing in the Turkish Women's First Football League. It was formed in 2010 as part of the 1951-established Football Club. Kireçburnu Spor is the only women's team among the 30 football clubs around in Sarıyer district. Club's current chairman is Yaşar Kalander.

The team finished the 2014–15 season in the Turkish Women's Second Football League as runners-up and was promoted to the Women's First League to play in the 2015–16 season.

Colors 
Kireçburnu Spor's colors are yellow and green.

Stadium 

The team play their home matches at the Çayırbaşı Stadium in Sarıyer.

Statistics 

(1): Season discontinued due to COVID-19 pandemic in Turkey
(2): Won the play-out
(3): Season in progress
(4). 3 penalty points due to not show-up in a match

Transfers 
After finishing the first half of the Women's Second League's 2014–15 season as leader, Kireçburnu Spor transferred Esra Özkan from Ataşehir Belediyespor and Gözde Sungur from Kdz. Ereğlispor. Followinf their promotion to the Women's First League, the club transferred Ezgi Çağlar, Çiğdem Belci from Ataşehir Belediyespor and Esra Erol, Yağmur Uraz from Konak Belediyespor. In the beginning of the 2015–16 league season, the club transferred another player from Ataşehir Belediyespor, the striker Merve Aladağ.

For the 2017–18 season, the club transferred seven players, among them three former members Merve Şıkkibar, Tuğba Babacan, and Beyza Kocatürk, and two players from Ataşehir Belediyespor Nagihan Avanaş and Hilal Çetinkaya, as well as one each from 1207 Antalya Spor Kübra Berber and from the Second League team Kocaeli Harb-İş the goalkeeper Seda İnci. On the other hand, the players Serenay Öziri, Ecem Cebeci, Kardelen Duran, Özge Çamurcu and Cansel Gözüaçık left the team.

In the 2021–22 Super League season, Faezeh Esfahanian, Hananeh Aminghashghay and Maryam Izadpanah from Iran were transferred, who played in the first half season only.

Current squad 

Head coach:

Kit history

Squad history

References

External links 

 
Association football clubs established in 1951
1951 establishments in Turkey
Football clubs in Istanbul
Sport in Sarıyer